Acarolella stereopis is a species of moth of the family Tortricidae. It is found in Argentina.

References

Moths described in 1931
Cochylini
Invertebrates of Argentina
Moths of South America